Wilderness is the debut studio album by the art rock band Wilderness. It was recorded, mixed and mastered in May and June 2004 by Chad Clark and T.J. Lipple at Silver Sonya in Arlington, Virginia.

Track listing
"Marginal Over"
"Arkless"
"It's All the Same"
"End Of Freedom"
"Post Plethoric Rhetoric"
"Fly Further To See"
"Your Hands"
"Shepherd in Sheeps Clothing"
"Say Can You See"
"Mirrored Palm"

References

2005 debut albums
Wilderness (band) albums
Jagjaguwar albums